There's a Light Beyond These Woods was singer-songwriter Nanci Griffith's debut album. It was recorded live to two-track over four days, December 9 to 11, 1977 and January 3, 1978, in Austin, Texas. Griffith wrote most of its songs, as she would on almost all of her subsequent albums.

The album cover features a photograph of Griffith taken in the autumn of 1978, tinted by Frank Golden, as well as lettering by her then husband, Eric Taylor. The cover was designed by Pat Alger and Griffith's father, Marlin Griffith.

Critical reception

AllMusic's Ronnie D. Lankford, Jr., wrote, "In retrospect, There's a Light Beyond These Woods sounds better because it sticks closer its folk roots. Fans only familiar with Griffith's later work will enjoy watching a young poet find her muse."

Rick Teverbaugh of Country Standard Time wrote of the album, "It was a bold venture because all but two of the nine songs were penned by Griffith. The instrumentation is sparse and the arrangements do nothing to get in the way of the songs' messages but also do very little to enhance the listening experience. It was recorded live with no overdubs in four studio dates. Her voice, even back in 1978, was striking and self-assured yet nowhere near the finely-tuned device that it would become in just six short years."

Louis Black of The Austin Chronicle wrote "Nanci Griffith's songs have always taken me back to those places. Reminded me how light shone through warped kitchen windows, how snow-covered mornings smelled, how a partner looked moving through the house. Griffith's songs develop like Polaroids of lost moments, often of almost mundane subjects – not great passion, but the way the bathtub tilted or heading outdoors to bring in oranges for juice. Photos I'd thought were long lost. Griffith's songs made me realize those snapshots will always be with me in some way."

LP Track listing

Personnel 
Nanci Griffith – lead vocals, acoustic guitar
Eric Taylor – lead vocals and acoustic guitar on "Dollar Matinee"
Tom Pittman – banjo
Stephen Doster – acoustic lead guitar
Rick West – acoustic lead guitar, dobro, mandolin
Tom Ellis – mandolin on "Montana Backroads"
Hugh Sparks – bass guitar, supporting vocals
Paul Kelly – bass guitar
John Hagen – cello
Mike Williams – 12-string guitar, wind chimes, supporting vocals
Richard Cooper – electric piano on "Alabama Soft Spoken Blues"
Carla Cain – supporting vocals
Lela Cain – supporting vocals
Maggie Graham – supporting vocals
Franci Files – supporting vocals
Frank Delvy – supporting vocals

Tracklisting and Personnel verified from the CD liner notes. The CD track listing is the same as the LP.

References 

Nanci Griffith albums
1978 debut albums